Kakumia is a genus of butterflies in the family Lycaenidae. The genus is endemic to the Afrotropical realm.

Species
Kakumia ferruginea (Schultze, 1923)
Kakumia ideoides (Dewitz, 1887)
Kakumia otlauga (Grose-Smith & Kirby, 1890)

References

Poritiinae
Butterfly genera